Chiesa di Sant'Andrea (Acquaviva) is a church in San Marino. It belongs to the Roman Catholic Diocese of San Marino-Montefeltro.

Roman Catholic churches in San Marino